Kristie Ahn and Nicole Gibbs were the defending champions, but both chose not to participate. 
Sharon Fichman and Marie-Ève Pelletier defeated Beatrice Capra and Asia Muhammed in the final 6–1, 6–3.

Seeds

Draw

Draw

References
 Main Draw

RBC Bank Women's Challenger - Doubles